Devolver Digital is an American video game publisher based in Austin, Texas. The company was founded in June 2009 by Harry Miller, Rick Stults, and Mike Wilson, who had co-founded publishing companies Gathering of Developers and Gamecock Media Group. Devolver Digital began by publishing high-definition remakes of games in the Serious Sam series, their first game being Serious Sam HD: The First Encounter. After success with these remakes and spin-off games based on the series, Devolver Digital began publishing games from other, smaller independent studios, one of the first being their breakout title Hotline Miami (2012).

Devolver continued to expand its operations by publishing titles from smaller indie developers, such as Genital Jousting. During this time, it published financially successful video games including Shadow Warrior (2013), The Talos Principle (2014), Enter the Gungeon (2016), and Scum (2020). By 2018, Devolver Digital had quickly grown to sixteen staff members and had published over a hundred games. In August 2020, Devolver Digital published Mediatonic's Fall Guys, which generated  within a month after release. In March 2021, Epic Games acquired Mediatonic, and as a result, Devolver Digital sold all its publishing rights to Fall Guys. Later that year, Devolver Digital became a public company while publishing titles such as Death's Door and Loop Hero. By then, the company had purchased Serious Sam developer Croteam while also purchasing Dodge Roll (Enter the Gungeon), Firefly Studios (Stronghold series) and Nerial (Reigns).

Games

References

External Links
 

Devolver Digital